The 2020 National Women's Soccer League season was the eighth season of the National Women's Soccer League, the top division of women's soccer in the United States. Including the NWSL's two professional predecessors, Women's Professional Soccer (2009–2011) and the Women's United Soccer Association (2001–2003), it was the 14th overall season of FIFA and USSF-sanctioned top division women's soccer in the United States.

The league was operated by the United States Soccer Federation and received major financial backing from that body. Further financial backing was provided by the Canadian Soccer Association. Both national federations pay the league salaries of many of their respective national team members in an effort to nurture talent in those nations and lighten the financial burden of individual clubs.

The season was scheduled to start on April 18 and end on October 18. The top four teams were to advance to the NWSL Playoffs, with the two semifinal matches on November 8 and the 2020 NWSL Championship on November 14.

On March 12, 2020, the preseason match schedule was cancelled due to the COVID-19 pandemic. As a result, the NWSL announced on March 20 that the regular season start would be delayed.

On May 27, 2020, the NWSL announced that the 2020 NWSL regular season and playoffs were canceled due to the pandemic, and that the 2020 Challenge Cup would mark the league's return to action. The 25-game tournament, held from June 27 to July 26, was hosted by the owner of Utah Royals FC, Dell Loy Hansen. On June 22, 2020, the NWSL announced the full rules and regulations for the 2020 Challenge Cup. The Houston Dash won the 2020 Challenge Cup.

On August 25, 2020, the NWSL announced a Fall Series, in which each NWSL team would play four games in September and October. To minimize travel and COVID-19 exposure, the nine teams were divided into three three-team regional pods. Portland Thorns FC won the Fall Series and associated Verizon Community Shield.

Teams, stadiums, and personnel

Stadiums and locations

Personnel and sponsorship 

Note: All teams use Nike as their kit manufacturer.

Coaching changes

Attendance 

Due to the COVID-19 pandemic, games in both the Challenge Cup and Fall Series were played behind closed doors.

Challenge Cup 

Hosted by Dell Loy Hansen, owner of Utah Royals FC, the 2020 NWSL Challenge Cup featured a preliminary round and knockout rounds. In the preliminary round, all nine teams were to play four games each. The top eight teams based on results from the preliminary round were to advance to a single-elimination knockout bracket, with seeding based on position in the preliminary-round standings. Before the tournament began, the Orlando Pride dropped out because of positive COVID-19 tests, and only eight teams played. The preliminary round therefore did not eliminate any teams and was played only for seeding the knockout rounds.

Preliminary round

Knockout round

Fall Series 
The nine NWSL teams were divided into three regional "pods" of three teams each. Within each pod, the teams played a four-game, home-and-away schedule (i.e., two games against each of the two other teams) between September 5 and October 17.

The NWSL announced the full schedule of the Fall Series on September 3, 2020. One day later, the NWSL announced that the winners of the Fall Series would receive the Community Shield trophy, named the Verizon Community Shield for sponsorship reasons, and a grant of $25,000 to present to their chosen community partner; $15,000 and $10,000 would be presented to community partners of the second- and third-place teams, respectively. 

The Portland Thorns won the Fall Series and the 2020 Community Shield, and directed the accompanying $25,000 grant to Mimi's Fresh Tees, a Portland-area company specializing in social justice apparel. The Houston Dash were second and directed the corresponding $15,000 grant to the Houston branch of the civil rights organization NAACP. The Washington Spirit were third and directed the corresponding $10,000 grant to DC SCORES, which uses poetry and neighborhood soccer teams to help children in need.

Standings

Individual awards 
As the regular season and the playoffs were canceled due to the COVID-19 pandemic, regular awards (including season, team and player of the month, and weekly awards) were not awarded.

References

External links 

 
2020
National Women's Soccer League
National Women's Soccer League season
United States